Edward Neumeier (born August 24, 1957) is an American screenwriter, producer and director best known for his work on the science fiction movies RoboCop and Starship Troopers. He wrote the latter's sequels Starship Troopers 2: Hero of the Federation, Starship Troopers 3: Marauder (which he also directed) and Starship Troopers: Traitor of Mars.

Career

Early career
Neumeier studied journalism at the University of California at Santa Cruz, then attended the School of Motion Picture and Television at University of California at Los Angeles (UCLA). After completing his bachelor's degree at UCLA, Neumeier started work in the Hollywood film business as a production assistant on the TV series Taxi. He went on to become a script reader in the Story Analyst's Union, working at Paramount Pictures and Columbia Pictures. During his time at Columbia, he advocated for putting Risky Business into production; after the film became an unexpected success, he moved on to a job as a junior executive at the Universal Pictures company.

RoboCop
Neumeier wrote his first outlines and film treatments for his first movie, RoboCop, as well as other spec scripts. He declined an offer of a vice-presidency at Universal Pictures, to develop the screenplay for RoboCop, with Michael Miner.

The rights to the screenplay were bought up by the Orion Pictures company, and was granted a budget of just under $15 million. Paul Verhoeven was assigned to make the movie.

Neumeier also co-produced RoboCop, which was released in movie theaters in 1987 in North America and some other locations. This movie was a success, and it drew just over 50 million dollars' worth of ticket sales in the United States alone. The success of RoboCop also motivated the production of two sequels, RoboCop 2 and RoboCop 3, and also two TV series, one live-action and one animated. Most of the creators of RoboCop had left before the production of these sequels.

RoboCop 2
The first sequel to RoboCop, RoboCop 2, was planned to have its screenplay written by Neumeier and Miner. He and Miner had written a dated rough first draft of a screenplay for RoboCop 2 in 1988 called The Corporate Wars. However, due to the 1988 Writers Guild of America strike, Neumeier was unable to write any more of the screenplay. The Orion Pictures company next decided to hire the comic book artist Frank Miller to work on his own screenplay for RoboCop 2.

Starship Troopers
A decade after the first RoboCop movie was produced, Neumeier rejoined Paul Verhoeven to work on Starship Troopers, which was adapted from the novel with the same name by Robert A. Heinlein in 1959. With violence and satire thrown into a story of efforts by the human race to ensure its survival, Starship Troopers was more successful in Europe, Asia, etc., than in North America where it drew gross ticket sales of about $54 million at theaters, although Artforum magazine selected this film as one of the "10 most artistic [film] achievements of 1997". Neumeier also appeared in this film in the brief role of a man convicted of murder and sentenced to immediate execution.

RoboCop Returns
In January 2018 it was announced that Neumeier was writing a direct sequel to the 1987 classic film that would ignore both sequels and the 2014 remake. "We're not supposed to say too much. There's been a bunch of other RoboCop movies and there was recently a remake and I would say this would be kind of going back to the old RoboCop we all love and starting there and going forward. So it's a continuation really of the first movie. In my mind. So it's a little bit more of the old school thing," Neumeier said.” In July 2018, it was confirmed a new film, titled RoboCop Returns, was in development, with Neill Blomkamp directing and Justin Rhodes rewriting an original script by Neumeier and Michael Miner. In 2019, Neumeier said that Blomkamp wanted RoboCop Returns to be as close to the 1987 film as possible saying that Blomkemp feels that "it should be the proper Verhoeven if Verhoeven had directed a movie right after RoboCop". On June 29, 2019, Blomkamp confirmed that the original RoboCop suit would be used in this film, saying "1 million% original" when answering a fan's question on Twitter. Blomkamp also gave an update on the script, saying "Script is being written. Going well! Imagine watching Verhoeven do a follow up film."

Personal life
Neumeier is father to two adult children, Casey Neumeier and autistic activist Shain Mahaffey Neumeier.

Filmography
Feature film

Direct-to-video

References

External links

1957 births
American film directors
American male screenwriters
Living people
University of California, Santa Cruz alumni
University of California, Los Angeles alumni